Al-Hashimi, also transliterated Al-Hashemi, Hashemi, Hashimi or Hashmi is an Arabic, Arabian, and Persian surname. The definite article Al- usually distinguishes the Arabic from the more numerous form.

It is the pronoun form of Hashim and originally designated a member or descendant of the Banu Hashim clan of the Quraysh.
The Islamic prophet, Muhammad was a member of this Arab tribe; his great-grandfather was Hashim ibn Abd Manaf, for whom the clan is named. Members of this clan are referred to as Hashemites or Hashimis. This refers in particular to:

 the Sharifs of Mecca, the rulers of Mecca from the 10th century until 1924. As descendants of Hasan ibn Ali they belonged to the Bani Hashim.
 the Hashemite royal family of Hejaz (1916–1925), Iraq (1921–1958), and Jordan (1921–present). As descendants of Sharif Hussein ibn Ali they belong to the Dhawu Awn, a branch of the Sharifs of Mecca, and therefore also of the Bani Hashim.

List 
Notable people with this family name include:

 'Abd al-Ilah (died 1958), Regent of Iraq
 'Abd al-Rahim ibn Ja'far ibn Sulayman al-Hashimi (died c. 844), Abbasid personage and governor of the Yemen
 Abdullah Hashmi'ties I of Jordan, king of Jordan
 Abdullah Hashmi II, king of Jordan, kings of Jordan 1999- present
 Abdul Razak al-Hashimi, former Iraqi diplomat
 Alaa Al Hashimi (born 1953), Iraqi politician
 Ali bin Hussein al-Hashimi (1879–1935), King of Hejaz
 Ali Hashemi (born 1991), Iranian weightlifter
 Ali ibn Sulayman al-Hashimi (ninth century), Muslim scholar
 Amir Hashemi (born 1966), former Iranian football player
 Amir-Hossein Ghazizadeh Hashemi (born 1971), Iranian politician
 Aqila al-Hashimi (1953–2003), Iraqi politician
 Asad al-Hashemi, Iraqi politician
 Bagher Hashemi (born 1994), Iranian footballer
 Bashir Al-Hashimi (born 1961), British academic
 Bobby Hashemi (born 1991), British entrepreneur
 Cyrus Hashemi (1942–1986), Iranian arms dealer
 Ehsan Ghazizadeh Hashemi (born 1976), Iranian politician
 Emraan Hashmi (born 1979), Indian film actor
 Fahad Hashmi (born 1989), Pakistani artist, actor and broadcaster
 Farhat Hashmi a Pakistani Canadian Islamic scholar 
 Farshad Hashemi (born 1997), Iranian footballer 
 Fatemeh Hashemi (born 1969), Iranian television actress
 Fawaz al-Hashimi (died 2004), member of Al-Qaeda in the Arabian Peninsula
 Faysal I of Iraq (died 1933), Hashemite King of Syria and Iraq
 Faysal II of Iraq (died 1958), Last Hashemite King of Iraq
 Ghazala Hashmi (born 1964), American politician representing the 10th district in the Senate of Virginia.
 Gita Hashemi (born 1961), Iranian-born Canadian artist, writer and curator
 Harun ibn Muhammad ibn Ishaq al-Hashimi (died 901), Abbasid personage and governor of Mecca, Medina and al-Ta'if
 Hashim Al-Hashimi, American biochemist
 Hassan Ghazizadeh Hashemi (born 1959), Iranian ophthalmologist
 Hisham al-Hashimi (1973–2020), Iraqi researcher
 Hossein Hashemi (born 1953), Iranian politician
 Hussein bin Ali, Sharif of Mecca (Hashemites), Ottoman Empire, King of Hejaz, King of the Arab Countries
 Ibn Sa'd Hashmi, (Katib al-Waqidi), was a scholar and Arabian biographer, Book (Book of the Major Classes)
 Ishaaq bin Ahmed bin Muhammad al-Hashimi, scholar and patriarch of the Somali Isaaq clan-family
 Ishaq ibn al-Abbas ibn Muhammad al-Hashimi (ninth century), Abbasid personage and governor of the Yemen
 Jabron Hashmi (1982–2006), British soldier who served with the elite 3 PARA Battlegroup and was killed in action in Afghanistan.
 Jamshid Hashemi (1936–2013), Iranian arms dealer
 Jassem Al-Hashemi (born 1996), Qatari footballer
 Javad Hashemi (born 1966), Iranian actor, film director, writer and composer
 Kioumars Hashemi, Iranian sports executive
 Manouchehr Hashemi (1918–2007), SAVAK intelligence agency officer
 Maryam Hashemi (born 1977), Iranian visual artist
 Marzieh Hashemi (born 1959), American-born Iranian journalist and television presenter
 Maysoon al-Hashemi (1946–2006), Iraqi politician
 Mehdi Hashemi (1946–1987), Iranian Shi'a cleric
 Mehdi Hashemi (actor) (born 1946), Iranian actor, screenwriter, and director
 Mirhani Hashemi (born 1983), Iranian footballer 
 Mohamed Al-Hashimi (born 1965), Omani sprinter
 Mohammad Hashemi (born 1951), Iranian businessman and former intelligence officer
 Mohsen Al-Hashemi (born 1990), Emirati footballer
 Mojtaba Samareh Hashemi, Iranian politician 
 Muhammad al-Hashimi al-Tilimsani (1881–1961), Algerian (by birth) and Syrian (by residence) Sufi saint and scholar
 Muhammad Yusuf Hashmi, Reformer and Leader of the Pakistan Movement, who achieved high distinction in English studies in British India
 Nadia Hashimi (born 1977), Afghan-American pediatric physician, novelist, and politician
 Sayed Rahman Hashemi, Afghan politician
 Reem Al Hashimy, minister of the United Arab Emirates
 Sahar Hashemi, British entrepreneur
 Sajjad Hashemi (born 1991), Iranian sprint athlete
 Saud al-Hashimi (born 1963), Saudi Arabian human rights activist
 Sayed Abdul Karim Hashimi, Afghan politician
 Sayed Maqsood Hashemi (born 1984), Afghan footballer
 Sayed Mohammad Hashemi (born 1994), Afghan footballer
 Sayed Rahmatullah Hashemi (born 1978), Afghan diplomat
 Sayed Zafar Hashemi (born 1985), Afghan politician
 Seyed Zia Hashemi (born 1968), Iranian politician
 Seyyed Mehdi Hashemi (born 1964), Iranian politician
 Shakiba Hashemi, Afghani politician
 Shamim Hashimi (born 1947), Urdu and Persian poet
 Taha al-Hashimi (1888–1961), Iraqi politician
 Talal Hashmi, kings of Jordan
 Tariq al-Hashemi (born 1942), Iraqi politician
 Wijdan Ali Al-Hashemi (born 1939), Jordanian artist, educator and diplomat
 Wissam S. al-Hashimi (died 2004), Iraqi geologist
 Yasin al-Hashimi (1884–1937), Iraqi politician
 Zakaria Hashemi (born 1936), Iranian actor and film director
 Zarina Hashmi (1937–2020), Indian-American artist

See also 
 Banu Hashim, the clan in the Quraysh tribe, to which the surname refers to
 Hashemites (disambiguation)
 Hashem, given name and surname
 Hashim, male Arabic given name
 Al Hashemi, United Arab Emirates-based architectural firm
 Sayyid, Sharif, Ashraf, honorific titles denoting descendants of the Ahl al-Bayt, the family of the Islamic prophet Muhammad

References 

Arabic-language surnames
Persian-language surnames
Dari-language surnames